is a V-Cinema release for Tensou Sentai Goseiger, serving as an epilogue for the series, prior to the Legendary War in the series' successor Kaizoku Sentai Gokaiger. The direct-to-video film was released on July 21, 2011.

Plot
After wiping out everyone's memories of Brajira's doomsday, the Gosei Angels go their separate ways to keep protecting the world rather than return to the Gosei World. Alata takes a job at a cafe, Hyde works in oceanic research at a university, Eri becomes a school nurse, and the Landick siblings take to farming. While changing bills at a bank, Alata is forced to expose himself as Gosei Red to tie up a trio of bank robbers. After formally introducing himself as a Gosei Angel, Alata finds that his Memoryfly Card is not working. Soon after, escaping his new-found fans, Alata learns from the others that he single-handedly exposed them all and that none of the others can use their memory-erasing cards to undo the mess. By then, a repaired Datas falls into the Amachi Institute and reveals a strange cloud formation is negating the memory-erasing Gosei Cards and is spreading before Master Head contacts the Gosei Angels to immediately return to the Gosei World. However, the Gosei Angels feel they need to track down the source, with Alata convincing the others to go public. After the Goseiger Emergency Press Conference, the Gosei Angels meet a man named  as he offers to be their manager and make them household names.

But overtime, as stardom runs them ragged and straying from their investigation, the Gosei Angels are tricked into breaking-and-entering the Prime Minister's estate. Luckily, Gosei Knight saves the gang as they are about to be arrested and gets them back to the Amachi Institute. However, the damage is done and the Gosei Angels are demonized; with Nozomu and his father the only ones who know they were framed. Then, while watching the news, the Gosei Angels realize that they were framed by someone in Sakai Entertainment. Demanding answers from Sakai, the Gosei Angels realize that Sakai Entertainment's staff and every other human there is emitting a black mist, the darkness in their hearts, it's feeding the cloud bank, and it's tied to the Bibi Bugs. Furthermore, the Gosei Angels learn that the one responsible is Sakai's aide, . Finding Yumeko, she reveals that her dreams of becoming an actress were dashed and she allowed herself to become the host of King Bibi, the last of the Bibi Bugs that masterminded the Gosei Angels' downfall by negating their memory-erasing cards in order to avenge his race. Forming himself over Yumeko, King Bibi uses the human's body to force the Gosei Angels not to fight back as their defeat is televised.

However, with Datas' help, Nozomu manages to pirate the broadcast to restore the peoples' faith in the Gosei Angels by reminding them of all the good they did. By then, as King Bibi's hold over the humans fades, Gosei Knight arrives as he and the Gosei Angels reach Yumeko, touching her heart. This completely disperses the dark clouds and weakens King Bibi enough for him to eject from her. Without his human shield, King Bibi is defeated by the Goseigers and Gosei Knight using their Gosei Knight Dynamic combo. Using the remaining darkness he absorbed, King Bibi enlarges himself as Ground Gosei Great is formed to destroy him. After checking up on Yumeko, assuring her to keep following her dream to become an actress, the Gosei Angels use their memory-erasing Gosei Cards to remove everyone's memories. Soon after, the Gosei Angels bid Gosei Knight and Datas goodbye as they go their separate ways again.

Cast
 Alata: Yudai Chiba
 Eri: Rika Sato
 Agri: Kyousuke Hamao
 Moune: Mikiho Niwa
 Hyde: 
 Gosei Knight: 
 Nozomu Amachi: 
 Professor Shuichiro Amachi: 
 Datas: 
 Yumeko Hoshino: 
 Sakai: 
 MC Matsu Tomioka: 
 King Bibi:

External links
Official website

2010s Super Sentai films
Films about angels
Japanese supernatural films